South Africa switched to a closed numbering system effective 16 January 2007. At that time, it became mandatory to dial the full 10-digit telephone number, including the zero in the three-digit area code, for local calls (e.g., 011 must be dialed from within Johannesburg). Area codes within the system are generally organized geographically. All telephone numbers are 9 digits long (but always prefixed by 0 for calls within South Africa), except for certain Telkom special services. When dialed from another country, the "0" is omitted and replaced with the appropriate international access code and the country code +27.

Background

History 
Numbers were allocated when South Africa had only four provinces, meaning that ranges are now split across the current nine provinces.
South-West Africa (including Walvis Bay) was integrated into the South African numbering plan. However, the territory had already been allocated its own country code by the International Telecommunication Union, +264, in the late 1960s.

Namibia 
Following its independence, Namibia discontinued direct dialing from South Africa, and replaced it with international dialing using the +264 country code. For example, for a call from South Africa to Windhoek, before and after 1992:

 Before 1992: 061 xxx xxxx
 After 1992: 09 26461 xxx xxxx
 After Jan 2007: 00 26461 xxx xxxx

Lesotho 
Calls to Lesotho could be made using the access code 050 instead of the international code +266; for example, to call Maseru from South Africa, subscribers would dial 0501.

Botswana, Swaziland and Zimbabwe 
Calls to Botswana, Swaziland and Zimbabwe could similarly be made using the regional codes 0192, 0194 and 0191, respectively, instead of the international codes +267, +268 and +263.

Number ranges

00 
International access code effective from 16 October 2006 and mandatory from 16 January 2007.

01 
The old Transvaal province, currently comprising Gauteng, Mpumalanga, Limpopo and part of the North West:
 010: New overlay plan for Johannesburg
 011: Witwatersrand region around Johannesburg, currently code for the entirety of Greater Johannesburg
 012: Pretoria and surrounding towns (also includes Brits)
 013: Eastern Gauteng (Bronkhorstspruit) and Western and northern Mpumalanga: Middelburg, Witbank and Nelspruit
 014: Northern North West and Southwestern Limpopo: Rustenburg and Modimolle
 015: Northern and Eastern Limpopo: Polokwane
 016: Vaal Triangle: Vereeniging, Vanderbijlpark and Sasolburg, which constitutes an anomaly, since Sasolburg isn't the old Transvaal.
 017: Southern Mpumalanga: Ermelo
 018: Southern North West: Mahikeng, Lichtenburg, Potchefstroom and Klerksdorp

02 
Western and Northern Cape:
 021: Cape Town metropole and surrounds, including Stellenbosch, Somerset West and Gordon's Bay
 022: Boland and West Coast: Malmesbury
 023: Worcester and greater Karoo, including Beaufort West
 027: Namaqualand (Northern Cape): Vredendal, Calvinia, Clanwilliam, Springbok, Alexander Bay, Port Nolloth
 028: Southern region: Swellendam and Caledon / Hermanus region.

03 
KwaZulu-Natal:
 031: Durban
 032: KZN North coast region: Verulam, Tongaat, Ballito and Stanger
 033: Pietermaritzburg and KwaZulu-Natal Midlands
 034: Vryheid, Newcastle and Northern KZN
 035: Zululand region: St. Lucia, Richards Bay, Ulundi
 036: Drakensberg region: Ladysmith
 039: KwaZulu-Natal South Coast region: Port Shepstone and interior, and Eastern Pondoland (in Eastern Cape)

04 
Eastern Cape and eastern parts of the Western Cape:
 040: Bhisho
 041: Gqeberha and Uitenhage
 042: Southern region: Humansdorp
 043: East London and surrounds
 044: Garden Route, including Oudtshoorn, Knysna, Plettenberg Bay, Mossel Bay and George
 045: Central region: Queenstown
 046: Southern region: Grahamstown, Bathurst, Port Alfred, Kenton-on-Sea
 047: Mthatha / most of previous Transkei
 048: Northern region: Steynsburg
 049: Western region: Graaff-Reinet

05 
Free State and Northern Cape
 051: Central and southern region: Bloemfontein, and Aliwal North in E Cape
 053: Kimberley, eastern part of Northern Cape, far west of NW province
 054: Upington, Gordonia region
 056: Northern Free State: Kroonstad
 057: Northern Free State: Welkom (Goldfields region) 
 058: Eastern Free State: Bethlehem

06 (Cellular) 
Cellular

 0600: Cellular: Used by Liquid Telecommunications (South Africa)
 0601 - 0602: Cellular: Used by TelkomSA (8.ta)
 0603 - 0605: Cellular: Used by MTN
 0606 - 0609: Cellular: Used by Vodacom
 061: Cellular: Used by Cell C
 062: Cellular: Used by Cell C
 0630 - 0635: Cellular: Used by MTN
 0636 - 0637: Cellular: Used by Vodacom
 0640: Cellular: Used by MTN
 0641 - 0645: Cellular: Used by Cell C
 0646 - 0649: Cellular: Used by Vodacom
 0650 - 0654: Cellular: Used by Cell C
 0655 - 0657: Cellular: Used by MTN
 0658 - 0659: Cellular: Used by TelkomSA (8.ta)
 066: Cellular: Used by Vodacom
 0670 - 0672: Cellular: Used by TelkomSA
 0673 - 0675: Cellular: Used by Vodacom
 0676 - 0679: Cellular: Used by TelkomSA (8.ta)
 0680 - 0685: Cellular: Used by TelkomSA (8.ta)
 0685 - 0689: Cellular: Used by MTN
 0690: Cellular: Used by MTN
 0691 - 0699: Cellular: Used by TelkomSA (8.ta)

07 (Cellular) 
0710: Cellular: Used by MTN
 0711 - 0716: Cellular: Used by Vodacom
 0717 - 0719: Cellular: Used by MTN
 072: Cellular: Used by Vodacom
 073: Cellular: Used by MTN
 074: Cellular: Used by Cell C 
 0741: Cellular: Used by: Virgin Mobile as of June 2006 to September 2021
 075: Cellular: Used by Purple Mobile South Africa
 076: Cellular: Used by Vodacom
 078: Cellular: Used by MTN
 079: Cellular: Used by Vodacom

08

Cellular 
 0810: Cellular: Used by MTN
 0811 - 0815: Cellular: Used by TelkomSA (8.ta)
 0816: Cellular: Used by Rain
 0817: Cellular: Used by TelkomSA (8.ta)
 0818: Cellular: Used by Vodacom
 0819: Cellular: Used by TelkomSA (8.ta)
 082: Cellular: Used by Vodacom
 083: Cellular: Used by MTN
 084: Cellular: Used by Cell C

Special Services 
 080: FreeCall, Toll-free, called party pays
 085: Cellular: USAL license holders - Vodacom and MTN have some prefixes out of this range for their USAL offerings
 086: Sharecall, MaxiCall and premium-rate services, calls can be routed to regional offices automatically
 0860: Sharecall Land line callers pay local call, called party pays long distance if applicable
 0861: MaxiCall caller always pay long distance for call even if routed to local office
 0862 - 9: Premium rate caller pays increasing rate linked to last digit
 0862, 0865, 0866, 08673, 08774, 08676: Fax to Email caller always pay increasing rate linked to last digits
 08622, 086294: Competition lines caller always pay premium rate
 08671 - 08674: Information services caller always pay increasing rate linked to last digit
 087: Value-added services (VoIP  among others)
 088: Fax Divert, Pagers and Telkom CallAnswer voicemail
 089: Maxinet, for polls and radio call-in services

Note that from 10 November 2006, mobile number portability was introduced in the cellular market. The cellular prefixes as above are therefore not strictly applicable anymore, although they remain mostly unchanged.

09X XXX XXX (Premium-rate and machine-related numbers) 
 090: Premium-rate services
 0902: Premium-rated adult services
 091: Premium-rate services
 092: Premium-rate services
 096: Machine-related services (14-digit numbers)
 097: Machine-related services (14-digit numbers)
 098: Machine-related services (14-digit numbers)

There are still some non-automated exchanges which use longer dialing codes, mostly for "farm lines" and remote areas with operator-assisted exchanges.

09X XXX XXXX numbers are no longer in use in South Africa.

External links
Independent Communications Authority of South Africa (ICASA) - South Africa’s communication regulator
How to call South Africa - howtophoneto.com

See also 

 Telecommunications in South Africa
 Internet in South Africa

References

South Africa
Telecommunications in South Africa
Telephone numbers